King Mahotaraprathet is the fifth King of Chiangmai. He is the first son of Thammalangka (2nd King of Chiangmai) and Queen Fongsamuth.  His birth date is 15 January 1804.  He was born with the name Chao Mahawong. When he was a regent during King Phutthawong, he was appointed as a general in a great troop of Chiangmai and Lumphun to attack three cities, Saton, Tuan, and Pu.  There was a report that a prince from Nyne city embedded the spies in those city to prepare against Lanna.  They won the battles and got 1,368 people, 47 guns, 15 horses, 246 cows and wrote report to Rama III. He received the name Mahotaraprathet for winning that battle.

See also
 List of the Kings of Lanna

References

1854 deaths
Rulers of Chiang Mai
Chet Ton dynasty
19th-century Thai monarchs